GNU Health is a free/libre health and hospital information system with strong focus on public health and social medicine. Its functionality includes management of electronic health records and laboratory information management system.

It is designed to be multi-platform, supporting Linux distributions and FreeBSD on the server side. It uses PostgreSQL as its database engine. It is written in Python and uses the Tryton framework as one of its components.

GNU Health has been adopted by the United Nations University. In 2011, it became a GNU official package. It was awarded Best Project of Social Benefit from the Free Software Foundation at LibrePlanet 2012, at University of Massachusetts Boston.

GNU Health is a project of GNU Solidario, a non-profit non-governmental organization (NGO) that works in the areas of health and education with free software.

History
GNU Health started in 2008 by Luis Falcón as a project for health promotion and disease prevention in rural areas. Its initial name was Medical. It has since evolved into a hospital information system, with a multi-disciplinary international team of contributors.

In August 2011, Richard Stallman declared GNU Health an official GNU Package. Following this, development was moved from SourceForge to GNU Savannah.

Usage
GNU Health is intended for health institutions and governments, with functionality to take care of the daily clinical practice, manage resources, and to improve public health.

Features
GNU Health uses a modular approach around the kernel, with different functionality that can be included to meet the health center's needs. Some of the main packages are:

Cultural impact
 GNU Health was presented at World Health Organization session "ICT for Improving Information and Accountability for Women’s and Children's Health" in WSIS Forum 2013.
 GNU Health was awarded the Free Software Foundation's 2011 Award for Projects of Social Benefit.
 GNU Health won the awards PortalProgramas 2012, 2014 and 2015 for Most Revolutionary Free Software and Software with Largest Potential of Growth in 2012.
 GNU Health awarded Sonderpreis at Open Source Business Award 2016
 In April 2022, GNU Health was included in the Digital public goods registry

Project milestones
 12 October 2008: Medical project registered at SourceForge
 2 November 2008: Medical Version 0.0.2 is released at SourceForge
 15 April 2010: Medical is registered at Brazilian government Portal do Software Público Brasileiro (SPB)
 31 July 2010: The Project is registered at the European Community Open Source Observatory and Repository
 16 April 2011: Thymbra transfers GNU Health to the NGO GNU Solidario
 18 April 2011: Medical switches the development environment from OpenERP to the Tryton framework.
 12 June 2011: The project is renamed from Medical to GNU Health.
 16 August 2011: version 1.3.0 is released, supporting Tryton and PostgreSQL.
 26 August 2011: Richard Stallman declares GNU Health an official GNU Package. At this point, the development portal is moved from SourceForge to GNU Savannah.
 29 October 2011: Release of GNU Health v 1.4.1. This version is also included at the Python Package Index – PyPI as a set of Python modules.
 25 June 2012: Creation of a public Internet GNU Health database test server in Amsterdam.
 9 February 2013: Release of version 1.8.0, compatible with Tryton 2.6 and Android client
 18 March 2013: Release of version 1.8.1, with Intensive Care Unit functionality
 7 July 2013: Release of version 2.0.0. Compatible with Tryton 2.8, New modules for Neglected tropical diseases, starting with Chagas disease. New Demographics section and Domiciliary Units management; new server installer; improvements to the surgery module (ASA physical status classification system and Revised Cardiac Risk Index).
 22 September 2013: Release of version 2.2.0 Dengue and Diagnostic Imaging Tests.
 14 November 2013: Release of version 2.2.2 GNU Health Patchset.
 27 January 2014: Release of version 2.4.0
 22 March 2014: First release of the GNU Health Live CD with GNU Health 2.4 and Tryton-Server 3.0.x on openSUSE 13.1. The Live CD offers a ready-to-run system with actual GNU Health and the Demo Database pre-installed. 
 6 July 2014: Release of version 2.6.0. Adds hash functions for document verification; digital signatures and GPG integration.
 1 February 2015: Release of version 2.8.0. Adds Tryton 3.4 compatibility, data aggregation and synchronization features for distributed environments, a Universal Person Unique Identifier (PUID) and Universal Unique Identifier (UUID) implementation, a HL7 FHIR server, birth and death certificates, and enhanced crypto features (GNU Privacy Guard integration).
 11 January 2016: Release of version 3.0.0: Tryton 3.8 compatibility (including web client support); Person functionality and disability module, inspired in WHO International Classification of Functioning, Disability and Health; basic Ophthalmology and Optometry functionality, and WHO ICD9 CM Volume 3 procedural codes
 2 July 2017: Release of 3.2 series. GNU Health HMIS packages are now written in Python 3. Enhanced genetic history and UniProt package on human protein related conditions; Emergency Management System; Insurance pricelist; Improved crypto modules on laboratory and services; GNU Health Federation and Thalamus initial development.
26 July 2017: With the release of openSUSE Leap 42.3, GNU Health 3.2 becomes part of the standard distribution. This goes in line with automated testing using openQA and an easy, script-based setup.
 26 November 2018: GNU Health Federation. Version 3.4 for HMIS node
 10 November 2019: Release of version 3.6 . Integration of a person events ("Pages of Life") with Thalamus and the GNU Health Federation Health Information system. Migration from Mongodb to PostgreSQL for the HIS component. Orthanc DICOM server integration. All components in the GNU Health ecosystem use Python3.
 24 June 2021: MyGNUHealth Personal health record released.
 3 April 2022: GNU Health included in the Digital public goods registry.

GNUHealthCon
GNUHealthCon is an annual conference organized by GNU Solidario. It provides the space for developers, implementers and community members to meet in person during three days. It includes sessions about social medicine, technical discussions, implementation cases and workshops.

GNU Health Social Medicine awards
GNU Health Social Medicine awards ceremony is part of GNUHealthCon. The awards recognize the role of individuals and organizations committed to improve the lives of the underprivileged. There are three award categories: Individual, Organization and GNU Health Implementation.

GNU Health Social Medicine Awards

See also

 GNU Solidario
 GNU Project

References

Other news and articles
 Webpage of the Ministry of Health of Jamaica on Health Informatics
 Article in The Hindu: Cheaper Health Care with Free Software
 Article in El Paìs, 09 November 2017, Sanidad del siglo XXI en el Camerún rural
 Video: Luis Falcón speech about GNU Health at MIT Global Health Informatics to Improve Quality of Care course. February 2015
 Luis Falcón: Sin Salud Pública no hay Desarrollo. Article in La Provincia, 3 July 2013
 GNU Health en Hospitales Públicos. Ministerio de Salud de Entre Ríos
 ALPI es pionero en la informática médica de Argentina gracias a la implementación del Software Libre: GNU Health
 Article in El Mundo: Liberar la salud con "software"
 Article in Linux Magazine: Projects on the Move
 GNU Health at the United Nations University
 TechRepublic. 10 open source projects that could really use a donation
 GNU Health é software livre para uso na área de saúde.- Linux Magazine Brasil October 2011

External links

 
 GNU Health Translation Portal
 GNU Health Con
 GNU Solidario
 GNU LIMS
 Tryton Project website
 Pediatrics Symptoms Checklist
 European Community Open Source Observatory and Repository
 

Free health care software
Health
Healthcare software for Linux
Software that uses GTK